Central Michigan University (CMU) is a public research university in Mount Pleasant, Michigan. Established in 1892 as the Central Michigan Normal School and Business Institute, the private normal school became a state institution and renamed Central State Normal School in 1895 after the Michigan State Board of Education took over governance of the school. The institution came into its own as a university and gained its current name Central Michigan University in 1959 under the university's 6th president Judson W. Foust.

CMU is one of the eight research universities in Michigan and is classified among "R2: Doctoral Universities – High research activity". It has more than 15,000 students on its Mount Pleasant campus. CMU offers 200 academic programs at the undergraduate, masters, specialist, and doctoral levels, including programs in entrepreneurship, journalism, music, audiology, teacher education, psychology, and physician assistant. The School of Engineering and Technology has ABET accredited programs in Mechanical, Electrical, Computer, and Environmental Engineering. CMU's College of Medicine opened in fall 2013.

The Central Michigan Chippewas compete in the NCAA Division I Mid-American Conference in six men's and ten women's sports.

History 

CMU opened its door in 1892 as the Central Michigan Normal School and Business Institute. Prof. Charles F. R. Bellows, a University of Michigan graduate, became the founding principal of the normal school in June 1892.

For the first year, 31 students attended classes in the Carpenter Building in downtown Mount Pleasant. Bellows surveyed the future location of the campus and was involved in the construction of the original Main Building, which opened in September 1893. Within the first two years, land was acquired, and a $10,000 school building was constructed.

During Bellows' tenure, he organized a separate Conservatory for Music through his own funds, which became incorporated into the Normal in 1900. He continued to teach as a professor and spoke to teacher groups throughout the State. Bellows also led an advertising effort for the school in order to gain more students.

In 1895, the Michigan State Board of Education assumed control of the school, renaming it Central Michigan Normal School. Bellows resigned from Central in the following year. He returned to Ypsilanti in 1902 to join the faculty of the State Normal School (now Eastern Michigan University).

By 1918, the campus consisted of 25 acres with five buildings. On June 1, 1959, with 40 buildings now standing on the 235-acre campus and an enrollment of 4,500 students, Central was renamed Central Michigan University. The designation reflected growth in the complexity of the school's academic offerings as well as its physical growth in the post-war period. Enrollment tripled over the next 10 years.

In response to the need for doctors to practice in rural areas, CMU opened its medical school in 2010.

Presidents 

Charles F. R. Bellows (1892–1896)
Charles McKenny (1896–1899)
Charles Grawn (1900–1918)
E. C. Warriner (1918–1939)
Charles L. Anspach (1939–1959)
Judson Foust (1959–1968)
William B. Boyd (1968–1975)
Harold Abel (1975–1985)
Arthur Emmett Ellis (1985–1988)
Edward B. Jakubauskas (1988–1992)
Leonard E. Plachta (1992–2000)
Michael Rao (2000–2009)
Kathy Wilbur (2009–2010)
George Ross (2010–2018)
Robert Davies (2018–present)

Governance
Central Michigan University is governed by a Board of Trustees, whose eight members are appointed by the Governor of Michigan and confirmed by the Michigan Senate for terms of eight years.

The Board of Trustees appoints and reviews the President of Central Michigan University, currently Robert O. Davies. Nancy E. Mathews was appointed as Provost and Executive Vice President of Central Michigan University on August 1, 2022, by President Robert O. Davies.

Academics

Admissions

Undergraduate 

CMU is considered "selective" by U.S. News & World Report. For the Class of 2025 (enrolled fall 2021), CMU received 18,517 applications and accepted 14,273 (77.1%). Of those accepted, 1,909 enrolled, a yield rate (the percentage of accepted students who choose to attend the university) of 13.4%. CMU's freshman retention rate is 77%, with 61.7% going on to graduate within six years.

Of the 57% of the incoming freshman class who submitted SAT scores; the middle 50 percent Composite scores were 1010-1223. Of the 10% of enrolled freshmen in 2021 who submitted ACT scores; the middle 50 percent Composite score was between 19.25 and 26.

Central Michigan University has seen a dramatic decline in enrollment in recent years. Between 2012 and 2022, CMU had a 46% drop in total enrollment.

Academic divisions

CMU has eight academic divisions:
 College of Business Administration
 College of the Arts and Media
 College of Education and Human Services
 Herbert H. and Grace A. Dow College of Health Professions
 College of Liberal Arts and Social Sciences
 College of Medicine
 College of Science and Engineering
 College of Graduate Studies

Academic work on campus is supported by the Charles V. Park Library, which holds one million books and can seat up to 2,655 patrons at a time. The university owns and operates the Brooks Astronomical Observatory.

The university's neuroscience program was named undergraduate program of the year in 2013 by the Society for Neuroscience.

Its most popular undergraduate majors, by 2021 graduates, were:
Psychology (207)
Exercise Science and Kinesiology (182)
Community Organization and Advocacy (155)
Marketing/Marketing Management (125)
Cell/Cellular and Molecular Biology (104)
Child Development (100)

The Central Michigan University College of Graduate Studies provides over 70 graduate degree programs at the Master's, Specialist, or Doctoral levels.

Research
According to the National Science Foundation, CMU spent $15.6 million on research and development in 2018.

Endowed lectureships

 Harold Abel Endowed Lecture Series in the Study of Dictatorship, Democracy and Genocide.  Focuses on the effects of historical events such as the Holocaust and mass murders in Africa, Southeast Asia, and Central America.  Named in honor of former CMU President Harold Abel.
 The Fleming Lecture Series.  Brings world-class mathematicians to campus. Speakers include Fields Medal winners Terence Tao, Sir Timothy Gowers, and Cédric Villani; and Abel Prize winners S. R. Srinivasa Varadhan and Louis Nirenberg.  Named in honor of mathematics professor Richard Fleming.
 Philip A. Hart and William G. Milliken Endowed Speaker Series for Integrity in Politics.  Focuses on political integrity and challenges students to approach politics in a way that embraces America's diversity of ideas and perspectives, working to supplant negativity and partisanship with creativity and innovation in shaping future public policy.  Named in honor of U.S. Senator Philip Hart and Michigan Governor William Milliken.
 William B. Nolde Lecture Series.  Focuses on intellectual discussions for future leaders both in the military and across the campus and community.  Named in honor of Army Colonel William Nolde, the last official combat casualty of the Vietnam War.

Athletics

The school's athletics programs are affiliated with NCAA Division I. CMU was a member of the Interstate Intercollegiate Athletic Conference from 1950 to 1970. Almost all Central Michigan teams compete in the Mid-American Conference; the one exception until recently was the women's lacrosse team, newly elevated from club to full varsity status for the 2015-2016 school year. It competed in the Southern Conference for a time, but joined the MAC for the 2021 season.

The football program is known for producing players such as Antonio Brown, & Joe Staley. Before moving up to Division I, the football team won its second NCAA Division II national championship in 1974 by defeating the Delaware Fightin' Blue Hens 54 to 14. Notable Division I years include 1994, 2006, 2007, and 2009 when they won the MAC Football Championship Game. In 2009, they finished the season ranked #23 in the final AP Poll and #24 in the final Coaches Poll marking the first time that a CMU football team had ever ended the season ranked in the Top 25 at the NCAA Division I-FBS level. Since 2014, the football program has made a college bowl game, and continues to see its players set MAC records yearly.

Frequently defeating both the Michigan Wolverines and the Michigan State Spartans in dual meets, CMU's wrestling team won its 10th straight MAC championship and seventh straight conference tournament title in 2008. The Chippewas tied for seventh at the NCAA Championships, scoring a school-record 69 points. Four individuals earned All-America honors.

The women's basketball program has excelled to new levels. In 2018, the team made its way to the sweet sixteen of the NCAA Division I women's basketball tournament. The team beat the LSU Tigers and Lady Tigers and the Ohio State Buckeyes in the first two rounds, only to lose to the Oregon Ducks in the third.

In 1958, the men's swimming and diving team was runner-up to the North Central at the second annual NAIA national meet, which was held in Muncie, Indiana.

In May 2020, the university discontinued its men's track and field program as part of budget cuts caused by the coronavirus pandemic. In June of the same year, CMU announced it had received a waiver from the NCAA Division I Council that would allow the football program to remain in the Football Bowl Subdivision and give the school two years to bring the total number of men's programs up to FBS compliance.

Student life

Residence life
Central Michigan University is home to 21 on-campus residence halls, arranged in four areas throughout the campus. In 2006, the 21st and 22nd residence halls on campus opened in the East complex. In 2019, the university decommissioned and demolished Barnes Hall, which was the oldest serving residence hall and the only one not physically connected to any other. In 2022, the University closed the North Residence Halls.

North Residence Halls: Larzelere, Trout, Calkins, Robinson 
South Residence Halls: Beddow, Merrill, Thorpe, Sweeney
East Residence Halls: Saxe, Herrig, Woldt, Emmons; Celani and Fabiano
The Towers: Carey, Cobb, Troutman and Wheeler ("The Original Towers"), Campbell, Kesseler and Kulhavi ("The New Towers")
It was announced by the university on March 3, 2022, that Larzelere, Trout, Calkins, and Robinson would be closed during the 2022 Fall semester due to semester enrollment estimates.

The majority of CMU residence hall rooms are two-bedroom suites designed for 4 or 5 people. Three of the Original Towers (Cobb, Troutman and Wheeler), nine-story high-rise residence halls designed primarily for freshmen, feature one-bedroom suites for three or four people. The fourth of the Original Towers, Carey, was renovated to double-occupancy rooms in 2020 as a means of managing decreased enrollment. The New Towers, as well as Fabiano and Celani, are designed primarily for upperclassmen, and are four-bedroom suites. Residents of Robinson, Carey, Celani, Fabiano, Campbell, Kesseler and Kulhavi pay an additional charge over the standard room and board rate.

Each district is connected to one of four Residential Restaurants. The Towers features the RFoC, or Real Food on Campus, and the East Complex features the Fresh Food Company.  Each area also has an after hours snack shop.

Some residence halls are designated as official Living Learning Communities, associated with a particular academic department, allowing students who choose to live there opportunities for study and collaboration with other students from similar programs.

Trout Hall – Business
Herrig Hall – Music
Emmons Hall – Health Professions
Woldt Hall – Science and Engineering
Sweeney Hall – Education and Human Services
Thorpe Hall – Honors Program
Calkins Hall – Leader Advancement Scholars & Public Service Residential Community
Troutman Hall – Multicultural Advancement/Cofer Scholars
Cobb Hall – Public Service
Kulhavi Hall – Transfer Students

CMU offers only co-ed residence halls, with Sweeney Hall the last to convert, from females only, in the fall of 2010.

Construction began on two more buildings, Celani and Fabiano, near the East Quad in the spring of 2005. The buildings are somewhat similar in design to the New Towers which opened in 2003. On December 1, 2005, one of the buildings was named The Ben and Marion Celani Residence hall to recognize the generosity of Detroit area businessman Thomas Celani and his wife Vicki.  On April 20, 2006, the remaining building was named the Fabiano Family Residence Hall, recognizing their contribution to the school.  John S. Fabiano served on the board of trustees 1999–2004, and also owns the Fabiano Brothers Inc, an alcohol distribution company.  These two new halls opened for the fall semester of 2006, along with a new Residential Restaurant to serve the residents of the six East Area halls.

Greek life
CMU recognizes academic, social, and professional Greek organizations which comply with university rules and regulations such as its anti-hazing policies. Currently, in the social realm, there consists of 12 fraternities and 12 sororities. Other Greek life organizations that pertain to honoCe, degrees, and multicultural backgrounds have formed as well throughout the years. Each is unique to their own roots, and provides a great networking opportunity for students at the university.

Recognized Fraternities:
Sigma Chi
Beta Theta Pi
Chi Phi
Kappa Sigma
Phi Delta Theta
Pi Kappa Phi
Sigma Alpha Epsilon
Sigma Pi
Sigma Tau Gamma
Tau Kappa Epsilon
Recognized Sororities:
Alpha Chi Omega
Alpha Gamma Delta
Alpha Sigma Alpha
Alpha Sigma Tau
Delta Phi Epsilon
Delta Zeta 
Phi Mu
Phi Sigma Sigma
Sigma Sigma Sigma
Sigma Kappa
Zeta Phi Beta
Zeta Tau Alpha

Professional Fraternities:
Alpha Kappa Psi
Beta Gamma Sigma
Delta Omicron
Epsilon Nu Tau
Kappa Kappa Psi
Pi Sigma Epsilon
Phi Chi Theta
Phi Mu Alpha
Sigma Alpha Iota
Gamma Iota Sigma

Honor Societies:
Alpha Psi Omega
Beta Alpha Psi
Kappa Delta Pi
Phi Sigma Pi

Campus safety

2018 shooting
On March 2, 2018, 19-year-old student James Eric Davis Jr. shot and killed his mother and father when they came to campus to take him home for spring break. After the shooting, Davis fled and the campus was placed on lockdown. Around 15 hours later, police arrested him and took him to a local hospital. The incident disrupted the travel plans of students and campus activities for several days. Davis was charged with two counts of murder and one count of unlawful possession of a firearm used to commit murder, and was later determined to be not guilty by reason of insanity and committed to a psychiatric institution.

Media
The campus' student-run newspaper is Central Michigan Life. The paper is published every Thursday during the academic year and www.cm-life.com, which receives 1 million page views per year, is updated daily. CM Life was named one of the top three non-daily newspapers in the nation for 2007, 2018, 2019 by the Society of Professional Journalists. It also was named the best college newspaper in Division I in Michigan eight of the past 10 years. CM Life has been named winner of the National Pacemaker Awards by Associated Collegiate Press in 1975, 1976, 1978, 1979, 1989, 1990, 2001, 2002, 2005, 2007, 2009, 2013, 2014, 2015 and 2016, 2019. It also was a finalist for the first time for an online Pacemaker in 2010. 
CM-Life has come in first place for the Best College Media Company in the nation seven years in a row (2014, 2015, 2016, 2017, 2018, 2019, 2020) by College Media Business and Advertising Managers organization.

There are also two student-run college radio stations, FM 91.5 WMHW-FM and FM 101.1, a student produced newscast, News Central 34, and a student-run college television station MHTV. In 2005, a student-operated music label called Moore Media Records (MMR) was established.

In addition, the university owns and operates WCMU-TV, the region's PBS station, and WCMU-FM, the NPR affiliate. Both stations serve most of Northern Michigan, including the eastern Upper Peninsula, through a network of repeater stations.

Also established in 2003 is White Pine Music, the recording label of the CMU School of Music.

On February 2, 2008, Central Michigan University's online magazine, Grand Central Magazine, was launched. Currently updated weekly, the magazine is run through CMU's Department of Journalism and features magazine style features from the world of sports, entertainment, style, technology and travel.

Notable alumni

Notes

References

External links

Central Michigan University athletics website

 
Public universities and colleges in Michigan
Education in Isabella County, Michigan
Medical schools in Michigan
Educational institutions established in 1892
1892 establishments in Michigan
Buildings and structures in Isabella County, Michigan
Tourist attractions in Isabella County, Michigan
Universities and colleges accredited by the Higher Learning Commission